Jørgen Sonne may refer to:

Jørgen Sonne (painter) (1801–1890), Danish painter best known for his battle paintings
Jørgen Sonne (writer) (1925–2015), Danish lyricist and writer